The WTA Montreal is a defunct WTA Tour affiliated tennis tournament played twice, in 1978 and 1980.  It was held in Montreal, Quebec, Canada and played on indoor hard courts in 1978 and on outdoor hard courts in 1980.

Results

Singles

Doubles

References
 WTA Tour history

Defunct tennis tournaments in Canada
Hard court tennis tournaments
Recurring sporting events disestablished in 1980
Recurring sporting events established in 1978
Sports competitions in Montreal
WTA Tour
Tennis in Quebec
1978 establishments in Quebec
1980 disestablishments in Quebec